Justin Dale (born May 28, 1971) is a rally driver and driver trainer from Winchester, Hampshire, England.

Dale started rallying in 1992 at the Peugeot Rally Challenge, driving a Peugeot 205 GTi. In 1996 Dale entered the British Rally Championship with co-driver Andrew Bargery for Peugeot Sport, finishing third overall. He continued to drive for Peugeot in the British Rally Championship through the 2000 season until 2001 when no season was held.

In 2002 Dale competed in the WRC competing in the Rally GB as a Mitsubishi factory driver.

In 2003 Dale competed in three rounds of the World Rally Championship as a driver for the Hyundai World Rally Team. He participated in the Cyprus Rally, Rally Deutschland, and Rally Australia.

References 

1971 births
World Rally Championship drivers
English rally drivers
Living people
Sportspeople from Winchester
Hyundai Motorsport drivers